Minnechaug Regional High School (MRHS) is a public high school located in Wilbraham, Massachusetts, United States, and has a student population of approximately 1,200. It is the only high school in the Hampden-Wilbraham Regional School District. It serves the towns of Hampden, and Wilbraham. The current principal is Stephen Hale. The school's official colors are green and white. Its school mascot is the Falcons.

Extracurricular activities
The school newspaper is called The Smoke Signal. The Student Council achieved the National Association of Student Council's highest honor, the National Gold Council of Excellence Award, every year since 2012. Roughly 70 students serve on the Student Council and dozens have been elected by peer schools to serve in regional and statewide student council positions.

Campus
Circa the 2010s a new lighting system was implemented that was intended to reduce costs; it had 7,000 lights total. The system relied on software for management purposes. However the software stopped working on August 24, 2021, and after that date, the school administration was unable to turn off the lighting system. Corky Siemaszko of NBC News wrote in 2023 that this was "costing taxpayers a small fortune." The lights staying on in the event of a failure was intended to maintain security at Minnechaug Regional.

Notable alumni
 Janice E. Voss, astronaut
 Mike Trombley, MLB pitcher
 Erin Crocker, race car driver
 Scott Rasmussen, co-founder of ESPN and founder of Rasmussen Reports
 Ann Sarnoff, CEO and Chairwoman of Warner Bros. and former President of BBC Studios America.
 Kelly Overton, actress

References

External links

Schools in Hampden County, Massachusetts
Public high schools in Massachusetts